Black Mask may refer to:

 Black Mask (magazine), a pulp magazine launched in 1920 by H. L. Mencken and George Jean Nathan
 Black Mask (film), a 1996 movie starring Jet Li, based on the manhua of same name by Li Chi-Tak
 Black Mask 2: City of Masks, 2002 sequel movie to the 1996 film
 Black Mask (anarchists), the original name of the situationist group later known as Up Against the Wall Motherfuckers
 Black Mask (character), a foe of the Batman in the DC Comics universe
 Blackmask (comic book), a three issue mini-series from DC Comics set in the 1950s
 Black Mask Studios, a comic book and graphic novel publishing company
 The Black Mask, a 1905 collection of short stories by E. W. Hornung concerning the gentleman thief A. J. Raffles
 The Black Mask (1935 film), a British crime film directed by Ralph Ince
 The Black Mask (1952 film), an Italian historical adventure film
 Black Mask, a character in Hikari Sentai Maskman
 Black Mask, a minor character in Mad Max: Fury Road
 Black Mask Studios, a comic book and graphic novel publishing company